Browns Island is a former island in the Sacramento–San Joaquin River Delta, now connected to the mainland. It is part of San Joaquin County, California. It appears on a 1913 USGS map of the area; its former location is labeled "Browns Island" on the 2015 edition of the map.

References

Islands of San Joaquin County, California
Islands of the Sacramento–San Joaquin River Delta
Islands of Northern California